José Pascual Monzo (Valencia, Spain, 1952) is a Spanish politician who belongs to the People's Party (PP).

Married, with two children, Pascual qualified as a technical agricultural engineer. After serving as provincial president of the Association of Young Farmers, he entered politics in 1989 when he was elected to the Spanish Congress of Deputies representing Valencia region. He was re-elected in 1993 and 1996 but did not stand at the 2000 election. Since 2004 he has been a member of the Confederation of Cooperatives of the Valencian Community  Following the PP election victory in the 2007 election to the Valencian regional parliament he was named Director General for the commercialisation of Agriculture, Fisheries and Food.

References

1952 births
Living people
People from Valencia
Members of the 4th Congress of Deputies (Spain)
Members of the 5th Congress of Deputies (Spain)
Members of the 6th Congress of Deputies (Spain)
Politicians from the Valencian Community
People's Party (Spain) politicians